Plicatol B is one of the three phenanthrenes that can be isolated from the stems of the orchid Flickingeria fimbriata. It can also be isolated from Dendrobium densiflorum, D. loddigesii, D. moschatum, D. rotundatum and Bulbophyllum kwangtungense

See also 
 Plicatol A
 Plicatol C

References 

Phenanthrenoids
Orchids